The Tamil Progressive Alliance (TPF;  Tamiḻ Muṟpōkku Kūṭṭaṇi) is a Sri Lankan political alliance. It was formed in 2015 by the Democratic People's Front (DPF), National Union of Workers (NUW) and the Up-Country People's Front (UCPF) to represent the 1.5 million Tamils, mostly Indian Tamils, living outside the Northern and Eastern provinces.

History
On 3 June 2015 a Memorandum of Understanding was signed by Mano Ganesan, Palani Digambaran and Velusami Radhakrishnan, leaders of the DPF, NUW and UPCF respectively, at the Taj Samudra hotel in Colombo. Ganesan was appointed leader of the TPF whilst Digambaran and Radhakrishnan were appointed deputy leaders. A. Lawrence, the secretary of the UCPF, was appointed general-secretary of the TPF.

Although the alliance was focusing on issues affecting Tamil people, particularly Indian Tamils, it would also serve Sinhalese and Muslims. The Ceylon Workers' Congress, the largest political party representing Indian Tamils was excluded from the alliance. The alliance would not contest elections but would fight for the political rights of Tamils.

On 5 June 2014 the three members of the alliance announced that they would contest the then upcoming 2015 Sri Lankan parliamentary election in alliance with the United National Party.

See also

References

External links 
 
 

 
2015 establishments in Sri Lanka
Political parties established in 2015
Political parties in Sri Lanka
Indian Tamil politicians of Sri Lanka